The Battle of Cherbourg was fought in the vicinity of the town in 1944.

The Battle of Cherbourg may also refer to:

Raid on Cherbourg, a British attack on Cherbourg in 1758
Battle of Cherbourg (1864), a naval battle in the American Civil War